Alexander H. Graham  (August 9, 1890 – April 3, 1977) was a North Carolina attorney and politician who served as the 17th Lieutenant Governor of North Carolina from 1933 to 1937 under Governor John C. B. Ehringhaus.

Graham was born in Hillsborough, North Carolina on August 9, 1890. His father, Major John Washington Graham, was a five-term state senator. His grandfather, William Alexander Graham, had served as governor, United States senator, and Secretary of the Navy.

A. H. Graham, a graduate of Harvard Law School, served in the U.S. Army during World War I and later was elected to the North Carolina House of Representatives (1921–30). He was elected Speaker of the House in 1929. In 1930, Graham chaired the search committee that hired Frank Porter Graham (no known relation) as president of the University of North Carolina at Chapel Hill.

Limited to one term as lieutenant governor by the state constitution of the time, Graham ran for governor in 1936, but came in third in the Democratic primary, behind winner Clyde R. Hoey and runner-up Ralph W. McDonald.

Graham later served as head of the State Highway and Public Works Commission (1945–1949 and 1953–1957).

References

Alexander H. Graham Papers at the Southern Historical Collection, University of North Carolina at Chapel Hill
The Political Graveyard
OurCampaigns.com

1890 births
1977 deaths
Harvard Law School alumni
Lieutenant Governors of North Carolina
North Carolina lawyers
People from Hillsborough, North Carolina
Speakers of the North Carolina House of Representatives
Democratic Party members of the North Carolina House of Representatives
United States Army personnel of World War I
20th-century American politicians
20th-century American lawyers